Elateridae or click beetles (or "typical click beetles" to distinguish them from the related families Cerophytidae and Eucnemidae, which are also capable of clicking) are a family of beetles. Other names include elaters, snapping beetles, spring beetles or skipjacks. This family was defined by William Elford Leach (1790–1836) in 1815. They are a cosmopolitan beetle family characterized by the unusual click mechanism they possess. There are a few other families of Elateroidea in which a few members have the same mechanism, but most elaterid subfamilies can click. A spine on the prosternum can be snapped into a corresponding notch on the mesosternum, producing a violent "click" that can bounce the beetle into the air. Clicking is mainly used to avoid predation, although it is also useful when the beetle is on its back and needs to right itself. There are about 9300 known species worldwide, and 965 valid species in North America.

Etymology
Leach took the family name from the genus Elater, coined by Linnaeus in 1758. In Greek, ἐλατήρ means one who drives, pushes, or beats out. It is also the origin of the word "elastic", from the notion of beating out a ductile substance.

Description and ecology
Some click beetles are large and colorful, but most are under two centimeters long and brown or black, without markings. The adults are typically nocturnal and phytophagous, but only some are of economic importance. On hot nights they may enter houses, but are not pests there. Click beetle larvae, called wireworms, are usually saprophagous, living on dead organisms, but some species are serious agricultural pests, and others are active predators of other insect larvae. Some elaterid species are bioluminescent in both larval and adult form, such as those of the genus Pyrophorus.

Larvae are elongate, cylindrical or somewhat flattened, with hard bodies, somewhat resembling mealworms. The three pairs of legs on the thoracic segments are short and the last abdominal segment is, as is frequently the case in beetle larvae, directed downward and may serve as a terminal proleg in some species. The ninth segment, the rearmost, is pointed in larvae of Agriotes, Dalopius and Melanotus, but is bifid due to a so-called caudal notch in Selatosomus (formerly Ctenicera), Limonius, Hypnoides and Athous species. The dorsum of the ninth abdominal segment may also have sharp processes, such as in the Oestodini, including the genera Drapetes and Oestodes. Although some species complete their development in one year (e.g. Conoderus), most wireworms spend three or four years in the soil, feeding on decaying vegetation and the roots of plants, and often causing damage to agricultural crops such as potato, strawberry, corn, and wheat. The subterranean habits of wireworms, their ability to quickly locate food by following carbon dioxide gradients produced by plant material in the soil, and their remarkable ability to recover from illness induced by insecticide exposure (sometimes after many months), make it hard to exterminate them once they have begun to attack a crop.  Wireworms can pass easily through the soil on account of their shape and their propensity for following pre-existing burrows, and can travel from plant to plant, thus injuring the roots of multiple plants within a short time. Methods for pest control include crop rotation and clearing the land of insects before sowing.

Other subterranean creatures such as the leatherjacket grub of crane flies which have no legs, and geophilid centipedes, which may have over two hundred, are sometimes confused with the six-legged wireworms.

Evolution 
The oldest known species date to the Triassic, but most are problematic due to only being known from isolated elytra. Many fossil elaterids belong to the extinct subfamily Protagrypninae.

Selected genera

Actenicerus
Adelocera
Adrastus
Aeoloderma
Aeoloides
Aeolus
Agriotes
Agrypnus
Alaus
Ampedus
Anchastus
Anostirus
Aplotarsus
Athous
Balgus
Betarmon
Brachygonus
Brachylacon
Brongniartia
Calambus
Cardiophorus
Cebrio
Chalcolepidus
Cidnopus
Conoderus
Craspedostethus
Crepidophorus
Ctenicera
Dacnitus
Dalopius
Danosoma
Deilelater
Diacanthous
Dicronychus
Dima
Drilus
Eanus
Ectamenogonus
Ectinus
Elater
Elathous
Eopenthes
Fleutiauxellus
Haterumelater
Hemicleus
Hemicrepidius
Heteroderes
Horistonotus
Hypnoidus
Hypoganus
Hypolithus
Idolus
Ignelater
Ischnodes
Isidus
Itodacne
Jonthadocerus
Lacon
Lanelater
Limoniscus
Limonius
Liotrichus
Megapenthes
Melanotus
Melanoxanthus
Metanomus
Merklelater
Mulsanteus
Negastrius
Neopristilophus
Nothodes
Oedostethus
Orithales
Paracardiophorus
Paraphotistus
Peripontius
Pheletes
Pittonotus
Pityobius
Podeonius
Porthmidius
Procraerus
Prodrasterius
Prosternon
Pyrearinus
Pyrophorus
Quasimus
Reitterelater
Selatosomus
Sericus
Simodactylus
Spheniscosomus
Stenagostus
Synaptus
Vesperelater
Zorochros

Notes

References

External links
 

Elateridae. Click Beetles of the Palearctic Region.
On the University of Florida / Institute of Food and Agricultural Sciences Featured Creatures website:
Click beetles, Alaus spp.
Conoderus rudis (Brown)
Conoderus scissus Schaeffer